Major General Abdulla Shamaal MA MSc ndu psc (born 5 July 1969) is the incumbent Chief of Defence Force (CDF) of Maldives National Defence Force (MNDF). General Shamaal was appointed to the post of Chief of Defence Force on 11 December 2018 by President Ibrahim Mohamed Solih. Shamaal was trained in various military institutions such as the United States Army Infantry School in Fort Benning, the Pakistan Military Academy and the Defence Services Staff College in India. Shamaal was previously discharged from service in November 2013 but was reinstated in December 2018 following High Court verdict that his discharge was unlawful. He has also held various Senior Command, Staff and Instructional appointments during his career.

Academic qualifications 
 Master of Arts Degree (MA) in Defence and Security Analysis (1999), University of Lancaster, UK
 Master of Science Degree (MSc) in Defence and Strategic Studies (2003), University of Madras, India
 Master of Arts Degree (MA) in Strategic Security Studies (2012), Distinguished Honor Graduate, National Defense University, Washington DC, US

Military training 
 Military Officers Cadet Training at the Pakistan Military Academy (1992 -1994)
 Infantry Officers Basic Training (1996) and Infantry Officers Advance Course (2000) at the US Army Infantry School, Fort Benning, Georgia
 Graduate of Defence Services Staff College, India (2003)
 Graduate of Asia Pacific Center for Security Studies, Hawaii, USA (2009)
 Completed Special Task Force Training (1991)
 Completed NCO Cadre Training (1992)

Achievements 
In June 2012, Gen. Shamaal graduated from the Counter Terrorism Fellowship post graduate program at the National Defence University (NDU) in Washington DC, obtaining a Master of Arts Degree in Strategic Security Studies - his third master's degree. He had the privilege of graduating as a Distinguished Honor Graduate of the course, receiving distinctions in all the electives, with a GPA of 4.0, and his thesis was nominated as an honor thesis at NDU.
Gen. Shamaal had the privilege of serving as the country's first Military Attaché in a diplomatic mission abroad. He served as a Defence Adviser in the Maldives High Commission in New Delhi from March 2005 to December 2008, and set up the first DA's office in India.
Gen. Shamaal was awarded the Best Allied Cadet at the Pakistan Military Academy, and was the first Maldivian Officer to be trained in Pakistan Military Academy.
In March 2012, Gen. Shamaal had the privilege of being the first Maldivian to be inducted to the United Nations Roster of Senior Experts on Security Sector Reform (SSR).

Professional experience 
Shamaal is an infantry trained officer by trade who had commanded the Male’ Command (MNDF Male’ Area), one of the four operational joint commands of the armed forces, the Training and Doctrine Command, the Marine Corps, and the former Quick Reaction Forces. He has also served in the field in the capacity of an Instructor. Shamaal also worked in the Ministry of Defence, heading the Directorate of International Defence Cooperation.

He has also attended various conferences and seminars on security and defense strategy, including the Near East South Asia (NESA) Center for Strategic Studies Executive Seminar at the National Defense University (NDU) in Washington DC in May 2001, the Non-Lethal Weapons Seminar at the Bangladesh Institute of Peace Support Operation Training (BIPSOT) in September 2003, and the Asia Public Affairs Symposium in Singapore in February 2003, and other conferences in New Delhi.

Decorations 
Shamaal has been decorated with the Distinguished Service Medal, Presidential Medal, Dedicated Service Medal, Defence Force Service Medal, Good Conduct Medal, three November Medals and Centenary Medal.

Family 
He is married to Fathimath Firasha, and has three daughters, Fathmath Yasmeen Shamaal, Aishath Yara Shamaal and Aminath Emma Shamaal.

Other work highlights 
In the period of 2009 to 2010, Gen. Shamaal also had the opportunity to take the initiative and play a key role in drafting and educating political leaders and security managers on the National Security Framework envisioned in the Strategic Action Plan of the President's Office of the Maldives.

With the transformation to a multi -party democracy in the Maldives in 2008, with the aim of aligning the armed forces with a democratic system, Shamaal helped the Ministry of Defence draft the new strategic vision for the armed forces - the Strategic Defence Directive (SDD) in May 2009. The aim of the SDD was to conceptualize the national security related policy and the defence structure of the country. It was the first explicit defence policy document written in the country's history which gave policy, strategic and doctrinal guidance to the defence establishment.

Shamaal also has the honor of being a senior member of the team that represented the presentation of the claim on the Maldives continental shelf at the United Nations HQ in New York, in March 2011. Later, he was also a senior member of the defence team that represented Maldives at the Department of Peacekeeping Operations, where they formally indicated the Maldives’ desire to take part in the UN peacekeeping operations in the future. His office in the Defence Ministry initiated and drafted the project for the soldiers to take part in the peacekeeping operations.

With the assistance from the United States government, and other countries, he has been able to host and coordinate several workshops and forums to educate and train the broader security community, practitioners and the political elite in the country on the need to create integration, participation and synergy within security agencies, and facilitate the democratization and nation-building process.

References

Maldivian military personnel
Living people
1969 births
Pakistan Military Academy alumni
Maldivian expatriates in Pakistan
Maldivian expatriates in the United States
Defence Services Staff College alumni